Oppenheim is a small town in Germany.

Oppenheim may also refer to:

 Oppenheim, New York, U.S.
 Oppenheim (surname)
 Oppenheim family, prominent European banking family since the 18th century
 Oppenheim Architecture, architecture, planning and interior design practice

See also
 Oppenheimer (disambiguation)
 Hempel-Oppenheim model